A list of the films produced in Mexico in 1944 (see 1944 in film):

A-D

E-Z

External links

1944
Films
Mexican